Axel Lobenstein (born 19 May 1965) is a German former judoka. He competed in the men's middleweight event at the 1992 Summer Olympics.

References

External links
 

1965 births
Living people
German male judoka
Olympic judoka of Germany
Judoka at the 1992 Summer Olympics
People from Apolda
Sportspeople from Thuringia
20th-century German people